Joseph Koukalik  (March 3, 1880 in Austria-Hungary – January 2, 1947 in Chicago) was a pitcher in Major League Baseball. He pitched eight innings in one baseball game for the Brooklyn Superbas on September 1, 1904.

After his short stint in Brooklyn, Joe played for the Western League, a Minor League Baseball Single A league. He played for the Omaha Rourkes as a pitcher and a batter. In 1905, Joe pitched twenty-eight innings for the Single A Rourkes. He allowed eight runs to score. As a hitter Joe had a batting average of .138.

References

1880 births
1947 deaths
Major League Baseball pitchers
Major League Baseball players from Austria-Hungary
Brooklyn Superbas players
American people of Austrian descent
Duluth White Sox players
Omaha Rourkes players
Lake Linden Lakers players
Austro-Hungarian emigrants to the United States